In mathematics, a Spin(7)-manifold is an eight-dimensional Riemannian manifold whose holonomy group is contained in Spin(7). Spin(7)-manifolds are Ricci-flat and admit a parallel spinor. They also admit a parallel 4-form, known as the Cayley form, which is a calibrating form for a special class of submanifolds called Cayley cycles.

History
The fact that Spin(7) might  possibly arise as the holonomy group of certain Riemannian 8-manifolds was first suggested by the 1955 classification theorem of Marcel Berger, and this possibility remained consistent with the simplified proof of Berger's theorem  given by Jim Simons in 1962. Although not a single example of such a manifold had yet been discovered, Edmond Bonan then showed in 1966 that, 
if such a manifold did in fact exist, it would carry  a   parallel 4-form,  and that it would necessarily be   Ricci-flat. The first local examples of 8-manifolds with holonomy Spin(7) were finally constructed around 1984 by Robert Bryant, and his full proof of their existence  appeared in Annals of Mathematics in 1987. Next,  complete (but still noncompact) 8-manifolds with holonomy Spin(7) were explicitly constructed by Bryant and Salamon in 1989. The first examples of compact Spin(7)-manifolds were then constructed by Dominic Joyce in 1996.

See also
G2 manifold
Calabi–Yau manifold

References

.
.

.

Riemannian manifolds